Phiroze is a male Indian Parsi name derived from middle Persian Pērōz (meaning victorious, triumphant or prosperous). The spelling of the name has many variations such as Pheroz, Pheroze, Phiroz, etc. but their pronunciation is the same.

People named Phiroze
  Phiroze Jamshedji Jeejeebhoy (1915–1980), Indian businessman
 Phiroze Palia (1910–1981), Indian cricketer
 Phiroze Sethna, Indian politician
 Phiroz Mehta (1902–1994), Indian writer
 Pherozeshah Mehta (1845–1915), Indian politician

See also
Piruz (disambiguation)
Peroz (disambiguation)
Parviz
 Feroz (disambiguation)